One Sports (formerly ABC Sports from 2004 to 2008, Sports5 from 2011 to 2017 and ESPN5 from 2017 to 2020) is the sports division of TV5 Network, Inc. and jointly-operated with sister company Cignal TV. One Sports supplies and airs major sporting events in the Philippines and the world for free-to-air TV channels TV5, One Sports channel, Cignal-exclusive channels One Sports+, PBA Rush, NBA TV Philippines and UAAP Varsity Channel, and online esports streaming channel GG Network.

Its flagship program is the Philippine Basketball Association, the world's second oldest professional basketball league, since it acquired the television rights from 2004 to 2008 and again from 2011 until now.

History

ABC Sports
The network's sports division, then known as ABC Sports, was established in 2004 as a result of ABC-5's acquisition of broadcast rights to the Philippine Basketball Association. The telecasts were known as the PBA on ABC, after the disbandment of the broadcasting consortium between NBN-4 and IBC-13. Aside from PBA, ABC Sports also broadcast volleyball games and local boxing bouts, as well as NBA basketball and WWE wrestling matches (in partnership with Solar Entertainment). But after ABC rebranded to TV5 in August 2008, the network still managed to cover the 2008 PBA Fiesta Conference Finals, though it is under the auspices of ABC's blocktimer MPB Primedia, Inc. After which, broadcast rights for PBA, NBA, and WWE were then moved to Solar Sports and RPN starting in the 2008–09 season.

TV5 Sports
In 2009, ABC Sports, still under management of MPB Primedia, was renamed as TV5 Sports in the interim (does not identify as such), in which the network acquired broadcasting rights to the ASEAN Basketball League (the Philippine team in the league, AirAsia Philippine Patriots, was by-then managed by ABC/TV5 owner Antonio "Tonyboy" Cojuangco, Jr.), U.S. boxing matches, and others.
In 2010, ABL's broadcasting contract with TV5 expired, after TV5 was acquired by MediaQuest Holdings, and was moved to IBC-13 and later, ABS-CBN Sports and Action.

Sports5
In 2011, TV5 and IBC, inked a blocktime deal which subsequently became AKTV. It was launched on May 5, 2011 through a marathon held at the Mall Of Asia Grounds in Pasay.

From then on, Sports5 obtained rights to air major sporting leagues and events like the Philippine Basketball Association, United Football League and the NCAA (returned to ABS-CBN Sports in 2015).

Until its flagship primetime sports block's closure in 2013 due to high blocktime costs and poor ratings, most of its programs are aired on IBC through its programming block AKTV. From June 2013 onwards, most of its sports coverages are shown on TV5, AksyonTV and Hyper. It is headquartered at TV5 Media Center, Reliance cor. Sheridan st., Mandaluyong.

Sports5 is the official TV partner of the Olympic Games in the Philippines from 2014 to 2016. In 2016, Sports5 acquired the Philippine broadcast rights (from ABS-CBN Sports) to air Ultimate Fighting Championship (UFC) on free TV and satellite.

ESPN5
On October 12, 2017, TV5 announced that it had reached a partnership with ESPN International to re-brand Sports 5 as ESPN5; the re-branding took effect the next day, coinciding with game 1 of the PBA Governors' Cup final. As part of the relationship, the channel acquired domestic rights to some of ESPN's U.S. and international programming, including classic boxing matches aired on ESPN Classic (also includes some matches from ESPN2's Friday Night Fights), IndyCar Series, the NFL, ESPN Films' documentary series 30 for 30 and Nine for IX, Around the Horn, Pardon the Interruption, U.S. college sports, and the X Games. Although ESPN is a U.S. NBA broadcaster, the league has a separate rights deal with ABS-CBN (under partnership with Solar Sports). The operation includes a local version of ESPN's flagship studio program SportsCenter, SportsCenter Philippines (which premiered on December 17, 2017), and collaboration between ESPN and TV5 on digital content—having launched a localized version of ESPN.com and the streaming ESPN Player service on January 31, 2018. The partnership marked the return of the ESPN brand to the country since the replacement of ESPN Philippines with Fox Sports Asia. Meanwhile, the re-launch as ESPN5 also caused the delays of many of Viva Television's planned productions for TV5 to late 2020 and early 2021 (especially Masked Singer Pilipinas and Kagat ng Dilim).

One Sports
On March 8, 2020, ESPN5 ceased to exist on television and was rebranded as One Sports (named after the then pay television channel of the same name), as both 5 and the new One Sports channel decided to not carry any ESPN5-branded programming on its schedule. The partnership continued however both on online as the ESPN5 webpage it was active and served as the de facto One Sports homepage in the Philippines and on-air as ESPN programs continue to broadcast on both 5 (later reverted back to TV5) and One Sports until October 13, 2021 as the new TV5 Network management will no longer renew a contract with ESPN due to massive negative feedbacks by the fans of the network's entertainment programming against former TV5 Network President and CEO Chot Reyes as well as poor ratings of its sports programming on TV5 and loss of advertisers' support. At the same day, 5 Plus was relaunched as a dedicated channel of One Sports which was moved from being an exclusive-pay television channel to free-to-air and eventually taking over its channel space. Meanwhile, its original pay television counterpart on Cignal was rebranded as One Sports+.

Following the closure of ABS-CBN Sports after 70 congressmen denied ABS-CBN Corporation's new franchise, One Sports replaced certain programming such as the NFL, NCAA (US), with some sports whose rights were previously held by ABS-CBN Sports, such as the NBA, ONE Championship and UAAP.

Current programs

TV5
National Basketball Association (NBA)
Philippine Basketball Association (PBA)
University Athletic Association of the Philippines (UAAP)  (Final Four and Finals only)

One Sports
30 for 30
Asian Tour
Badminton Asia Championships (national teams and individuals)
Boxing's Greatest Fights
European Tour
Manny Pacquiao presents Blow by Blow
National Basketball Association (NBA)
National Cheerleading Championship
NJPW Strong
NJPW sa One Sports
ONE Championship
PBA Developmental League (PBA D-League)
Philippine Basketball Association (PBA)
PBA 3x3
Philippine Collegiate Champions League
 Premier Volleyball League 
SM-National Basketball Training Center League
Spikers' Turf
Philippines national football team (The Azkals)
The Game
The Nationals
Top Rank Boxing
University Athletic Association of the Philippines
WWE Raw
WWE SmackDown

One Sports+

The Game 
Maharlika Pilipinas Basketball League (simulcast on One PH)
WWE Bottom Line
FIBA World Basketball
Greatest of all Time

PBA Rush
Basketball Science
The Chasedown
PBA Rulebook
Swagg Anatomy
Shootaround
Basketball Almanac
Numbers
The Huddle (simulcast on One PH and One Sports channel)
Step Back
Jumpball (simulcast on One PH and One Sports channel)

NBA TV Philippines

NBA Hype
NBA Spotlight

UAAP Varsity Channel

School Spirit
Glory Days
The Bounce
Step Up

GG Network
Electronic Sports and Gaming Summit events
The Nationals
Geeks and Gamers Guide

Previous programs

Block
AKTV (2011–2013)

Programs

Sports5.ph
Speedo G-League

Sports broadcasters

Current on-air staff

 - currently on hiatus due to COVID-19 Pandemic

Past on-air staff

See also
Philippine Basketball Association
TV5
One Sports (TV channel)
PBA Rush
PBA on NBN/IBC
ABS-CBN Sports

References

External links
 

TV5 Network
Sports divisions of TV channels
Television channels and stations established in 2004
2004 establishments in the Philippines